Zacharias Conrad von Uffenbach (22 February 1683 – 6 January 1734) was a German scholar, bibliophile, book-collector, traveller, palaeographer, and consul in Frankfurt am Main who is best known today for his published travelogues.

Biography 
He was born in lawyer's family. His younger brother Johann Friedrich von Uffenbach accompanied him on his travels.

Uffenbach described 18th-century curiosity cabinets and scientific collections that later became the basis for museums, such as the private collection of Hans Sloane, that later was absorbed into what today is the British Museum. In 1710 he visited Cambridge and Oxford to examine manuscripts in University libraries, as well as the Repository of the Royal Society in London. While in England he made detailed catalogues of all the books contained in the Peterhouse Library of Cambridge University.

His Merkwürdige Reisen durch Niedersachsen, Holland und Engelland was published in 1753 and related his travels during the years 1709-1711 through the towns Hassel (Bergen), Goslar, Clausthal-Zellerfeld, Blankenburg, Quedlinburg, Halberstadt, Magdeburg, Helmstadt, Braunschweig, Wolfenbuttel, Salzdahlum, Hildesheim, Hannover, Herrenhausen, Zelle, Lüneburg, Rakeburg, Lübeck, Hamburg, Stade, Bremen, Emden, Groningen, Leeuwarden, Franeker, Harlingen, Bolsward, Zwolle, Deventer, Harderwijk, Amersfoort, Utrecht, Amsterdam, Leiden, Rotterdam, Delft, The Hague, Haarlem, London, Greenwich, Cambridge, Oxford, Hampton Court, Kensington, Woodstock, Richmond, London, Düsseldorf, and Cologne. In the Netherlands he met with Campegius Vitringa, Pieter Burman the Elder, Antonie van Leeuwenhoek, Prosper Marchand, Bernard Picart, Jakob Gronovius, Herman Boerhaave, Johannes Musschenbroeck (father of the scientist Pieter van Musschenbroek), and Frederick Ruysch. In England he met with Hans Sloane.

Uffenbach collected a big collection of oriental manuscripts. In 1711 his library contained about 12.000 books. After his death Johann Christoph Wolf acquired his collection.

Works 

 Zacharias Conrad von Uffenbach, Merckwürdige Reisen, Bd. 2 (published after the authors death in Ulm, 1753).
 Zacharias Conrad von Uffenbach, Merckwürdige Reisen, Bd. 3 (published after the authors death in Ulm, 1754).

See also 
 Minuscule 101
 Uncial 0121b

References

Further reading 

 Hermann, Leben Herrn Zacharias Conrad von Uffenbach etc. Ulm 1753 (Sonderabdruck aus dem ersten Bande der „Merkwürdigen Reisen“). – Jöcher, Allgem. Gel.-Lex., Leipzig 1750 f., IV, 1562. – Gwinner, Kunst und Künstler in Frankfurt a. M. Frankf. 1862, S. 263.
Quarrell, W. H. & Mare Margaret (trans & ed). London in 1710, From the Travels of Zacharias Conrad von Uffenbach. London: Faber & Faber Limited.

External links 

 Zacharias Conrad von Uffenbach (1683-1734)
 Ernst Kelchner, Zacharias Konrad von Uffenbach, Die von Uffenbach'schen Manuscripte auf der Stadtbibliothek zu Frankfurt a. M., Frankfurt a. M., Frankfurt 1860.
 Cambridge under Queen Anne

1683 births
1734 deaths
German scholars
Writers from Frankfurt
Book and manuscript collectors
German travel writers
German male non-fiction writers